What Is Love? is the first studio album by American rock band Never Shout Never, which was released on January 26, 2010. 

The album debuted at #24 on the Billboard 200. The album sold 21,000 copies.

Background
The album was produced by Butch Walker. The first single "What Is Love?" was released on December 15, 2009. The music video was released in 2009 and was directed by Isaac Ravishankara. "I Love You 5" was released on February 4, 2010 as the second single with the music video being released 2 days prior. "Can't Stand It" was released on March 4, 2010 as the third and final single along with its music video that same day directed by Isaac Ravishankara. The video includes visual references of Bob Dylan's, Dont Look Back and The Beatles, A Hard Day's Night. The song peaked at number 29 on the Billboard Rock Digital Song Sales chart.

Critical reception

On Metacritic, which assigns a rating out of 100 to reviews from mainstream critics, the album gained an average score of 55, based on 4 reviews, indicating "mixed to average reviews". The album was given a 2 star rating from Andrew Leahey of AllMusic. He complimented Drew's ability to write a pop melody however, criticized his vocals calling it, "pinched" and "nasal." Scott Heisel of Alternative Press wrote, "while it is all good in the Never Shout Never camp, it's going to get better, faster than everyone thinks." Christian Hoard of Rolling Stone gave the album a more negative review stating, "Drew took some bad lessons from emo and his dad's folk records. The vocals are often pained and piercing, and his manner can be gratingly precious – especially on 'Can't Stand It'."

Track listing

Personnel
Credits for What Is Love? adapted from AllMusic.

Musicians
 Christofer Ingle Drew – instrumentation, vocals
 Caleb Denison – bass, electric guitar
 Dustin Dobernig – piano, keyboards
 Nathan Ellison – percussion, drums
 Butch Walker – backing vocals

Production
 Christofer Ingle Drew - photography
 Craig Aaronson - A&R
 Jonathan Allen - engineer
 Thomas Bowes - concert master
 Lori Casteel - music preparation
 Mike Casteel - music preparation
 Vic Fraser - music preparation
 Isobel Griffiths - string contractor

 Joe Kaplan - mixing
 Andrew Kitchen - assistant 
 Frank Maddocks - design - photography
 Rob Mathes - string arrangement, string conductor
 Dave McNair - mastering
 Perry Montague-Mason - concert master
 Jake Sinclair - engineer
 Butch Walker - producer
 Perry Watts-Russell - A&R

Charts

References

2010 debut albums
Never Shout Never albums
Albums produced by Butch Walker
Sire Records albums
Warner Records albums